In Greek mythology, the Spercheides (Ancient Greek: Σπερχειδες), also known as the Maliades (Μηλίδες), were naiads of the Spercheus River, in Malis. They were sometimes held to be the daughters of the river god Spercheus and the naiad Deino, although Antoninus Liberalis reported the tradition that Cerambus was punished for making this claim.

Note 

Naiads
Greek legendary creatures

Reference 

 Antoninus Liberalis, The Metamorphoses of Antoninus Liberalis translated by Francis Celoria (Routledge 1992). Online version at the Topos Text Project.